Sarlio was the Duke of Spoleto from 940 until 943. He was originally from Provence and served as a count of the palace under King Hugh.

According to Liutprand of Cremona, the king gave money to Sarlio to raise opposition to Duke Anscar of Spoleto. Sarlio married the widow of the previous duke, Theobald I, a nephew (nepos) of Hugh's, and obtained information and followers in Spoleto. At a date unspecified, Sarlio raised a revolt against Anscar, who left the city of Spoleto to engage him in the battle of Spoleto. Although Sarlio did not enter the battle personally, his troops were victorious and Anscar was killed.

In 941 Hugh took several monasteries in the march of Tuscany and the march of Fermo, including the abbey of Farfa, and gave them to Sarlio, who took the title "rector of the Sabina" according to the Chronicon Farfense. In 943, Hugh forced Sarlio to retire to a monastery—accusing him of murdering Anscar—and placed his bastard son Hubert, already ruling Tuscany, in charge of Spoleto.

Notes

Citations

Sources

10th-century dukes of Spoleto
People from Provence
10th-century Christian monks